The Heavenly Sovereign was the first Chinese legendary king after Pangu’s era. According to Yiwen Leiju, he was the first of the Three Sovereigns.

Name
The book Lushi from the Song Dynasty records that his family name was Wang (望, meaning to want or watch), his given name Huo (獲, meaning hunt), and his courtesy name Zirun (子潤, run means to be wet).

Biography
According to the "Basic Annals of the Three Sovereigns" (三皇本紀) in Sima Zhen’s supplement to the Records of the Grand Historian:

After Heaven and Earth were formed, there was Tiānhuáng, who had twelve heads, cast his magic to fill the Earth with water.
The king was said to have an unselfish personality(or in a calm state or living in retirement) that even if he did not try to help the people, people's customs changed for the better.(澹泊無所施為，而民俗自化)
And, Tiānhuáng was a king of many achievements. He lived to 18,000 years old. His twelve children supported him in reigning the world.
His greatest achievement was suppressing all the chaos, dividing the world for the many tribes, and choosing the best people to rule the tribes.

His successor was the Earthly Sovereign.

According to the Yiwen Leiju,
Based on Shixue (始學) by Xiang Jun, after the heaven and earth were formed, there was the Heavenly Sovereign, with 13 heads(or 13 leaders). He was called Tianling (天靈, ‘heavenly spirit’) and ruled the world for 18,000 years.
Based on Dongming Ji (洞冥記), there were 13 people with the same family name.
Based on the records in the Three Five Historic Records (三五歷紀) by Xu Zheng, when history began, life started to exist, and there was a divine spirit that had 13 heads called Tianhuang.
Based on Chunqiu Wei (春秋緯), there were Heavenly, Earthly and Heavenly Sovereigns, they had 9 brothers and divided the world into the Nine Provinces, which spanned the world.
Based on Dunjiakaishan Tu (遁甲開山圖), the emperor's remains are said to be under the Kunlun in Zhuzhou (柱州).

See also
Chinese mythology
Three Sovereigns and Five Emperors

References 

|-

Three Sovereigns and Five Emperors
Chinese monarchs